The Imperial Stock Ranch Headquarters Complex is a historic district near Shaniko in Wasco County, Oregon, United States, listed on the National Register of Historic Places.

See also 
National Register of Historic Places listings in Wasco County, Oregon

References

External links
 Imperial Stock Ranch (official website)

National Register of Historic Places in Wasco County, Oregon
Ranches on the National Register of Historic Places in Oregon
1900 establishments in Oregon
Houses in Wasco County, Oregon
Historic districts on the National Register of Historic Places in Oregon